El Fortín Conde de Mirasol, also known as Fuerte de Vieques,  is a fort built in 1845 located in the town of Isabel Segunda in Vieques, an island municipality of Puerto Rico. In 1991, the fort was restored by the Institute of Puerto Rican Culture. The structure  houses the Vieques Museum of Art and History and the Vieques Historic Archives, an extensive collection of documents related to the history of Vieques. It was listed on the National Register of Historic Places in 1977.

Gallery

See also 
 National Register of Historic Places listings in Puerto Rico

References

External links

 The Museum Fort Count Mirasol
 Photos of The Museum Fort Count Mirasol
 Fuerte Conde de Mirasol, Vieques, Institute of Puerto Rican Culture (Spanish)

Government buildings on the National Register of Historic Places in Puerto Rico
Government buildings completed in 1845
History museums in Puerto Rico
Art museums and galleries in Puerto Rico
Military and war museums in Puerto Rico
Vieques, Puerto Rico
Spanish Colonial architecture in Puerto Rico
Forts on the National Register of Historic Places